Archilema uelleburgensis is a moth of the subfamily Arctiinae. It was described by Embrik Strand in 1912, originally under the genus Eilema. It is found in Equatorial Guinea, Kenya, Malawi, Nigeria, South Africa and Uganda.

References

Moths described in 1912
Lithosiini
Moths of Africa